The Town of Richmond Hill 2006 Municipal Elections were held on November 13, 2006.  One mayor, two Regional & Local Councillors and six local Councillors were elected to represent residents of the town of Richmond Hill, Ontario, Canada.  Additionally, school trustees were elected to the York Region District School Board, York Catholic District School Board, Conseil scolaire de district du Centre-Sud-Ouest and Conseil scolaire de district catholique Centre-Sud.

These elections were held in conjunction with all other municipalities across Ontario (see 2006 Ontario municipal elections).

Potential issues
development and urban sprawl
protection of the Oak Ridges Moraine
waste management

Changes to ward boundaries
 
The boundaries for all six Richmond Hill wards changed on December 1, 2006.  Although the boundary changes did not officially take place until shortly after the election, voters cast their ballots for Local Councillor based upon the following new boundaries:

Richmond Hill - All Wards
Richmond Hill - Ward 1
Richmond Hill - Ward 2
Richmond Hill - Ward 3
Richmond Hill - Ward 4
Richmond Hill - Ward 5
Richmond Hill - Ward 6

Candidates

Mayor

Local Council

Ward 1

Ward 2

Ward 3

Ward 4

Ward 5

Ward 6

School Boards

York Region District School Board - Wards 1, 4 and 6

York Region District School Board - Wards 2, 3 and 5

Note: On July 3, 2007 Trustee Carrie Sheppard submitted her resignation, on July 10, 2007 the position was awarded to the runner-up candidate Peter Luchowski

York Catholic District School Board

Conseil scolaire de district du Centre-Sud-Ouest

Conseil scolaire de district catholique Centre-Sud

References

External links
Official Richmond Hill Vote 2006 website

2006 Ontario municipal elections
Politics of Richmond Hill, Ontario